Bengt O. Muthén is a psychometrician and Professor Emeritus at the Graduate School of Education & Information Studies, University of California, Los Angeles. He is a former president of the Psychometric Society.

References

External links 
 Profile at MPlus 
 Bio at GSEIS, University of California, Los Angeles

Psychometricians
UCLA Graduate School of Education and Information Studies faculty
Living people
Year of birth missing (living people)